Kelash Quh (also Romanized as Kelāsh Qūh) is a village in Kalashi Rural District, Kalashi District, Javanrud County, Kermanshah Province, Iran. At the 2006 census, its population was 319, in 59 families.

References 

Populated places in Javanrud County